Birtinya is a suburb of Kawana Waters in the Sunshine Coast Region, Queensland, Australia. In the  Birtinya had a population of 1,933 people.

Geography 
It contains the neighbourhood of Kawana Forest.

History
The name Birtinya is reportedly an Aboriginal word meaning neighbouring proposed by the development company, Alfred Grant Pty Ltd, on 31 March 1960.

Pacific Lutheran College opened on 26 September 2001; it is now within the boundaries of neighbouring Meridan Plains.

In the 2011 census, Birtinya had a population of 314 people.

In the  Birtinya had a population of 1,933 people.

Education
There are no schools in Birtinya. The nearest government primary and secondary school is Kawana Waters State College in neighbouring Bokarina to the east.

Amenities
Birtinya is built around Lake Kawana, which includes a  buoyed course for flat water competitions.

The Lake Kawana Community Centre located beside the lake on Sportsmans Drive provides 15 spaces (halls and meeting rooms) together with commercial kitchen facilities and smaller kitchenettes for community events. It is operated by the Sunshine Coast Regional council. The centre was officially opened on 5 November 2005 by City of Caloundra mayor Don Aldous.

Sunshine Coast University Hospital (SCUH) is located in Birtinya; it is a tertiary, teaching hospital servicing all parts of the Sunshine Coast and Gympie Region. SCUH saw its first patients on 21 March 2017 and was officially opened on 19 April 2017 by the Queensland Premier and Minister for Health and Minister for Ambulance Services.
SCUH opened with about 450 beds, with plans to grow to 738 beds by 2021. Services and capacity at SCUH will continue to develop over the coming years.

References

External links
 

Suburbs of the Sunshine Coast Region
Kawana Waters, Queensland